Götz Adriani (born 21 November 1940 in Stuttgart) is a German art historian.

Born as the son of an art historian (Gert Adriani), he studied history of art, archaeology and history at the universities of Munich, Vienna and Tübingen, earning a doctorate in 1964 on the topic of the design of medieval places of sermon. After working for some years as a conservator in Darmstadt, Adriani became the director of the newly founded Kunsthalle in Tübingen, the town of his last alma mater, in 1971.

In his more than 30 years at the Kunsthalle (1971 to 2005), he made it one of the most prestigious museums, especially for modern and contemporary art, in Germany.

Honours
Since 1985, Adriani holds the title of an honorary professor at the State Academy of Fine Arts in Karlsruhe.

Adriani received some of the highest French orders of merit in the field of arts: the Ordre des Palmes Académiques in 1985 and the Ordre des Arts et des Lettres in the late 1990s.

In 2001 he received the highest Order of Merit of the State of Baden-Württemberg, in 2008 the Order of Merit of the Federal Republic of Germany (Officer's Cross).

In 2012 he became honorary citizen of Tübingen.

Published works
He published important work documentation books on Joseph Beuys (1994), Paul Cézanne (1982 and 2006), Auguste Renoir (1988), Henri de Toulouse-Lautrec (1987) and the contemporary German painters known as Junge Wilde (2003).

References

German art historians
Living people
1940 births
Officers Crosses of the Order of Merit of the Federal Republic of Germany
Recipients of the Order of Merit of Baden-Württemberg
Recipients of the Ordre des Palmes Académiques
Recipients of the Ordre des Arts et des Lettres
German male non-fiction writers
German expatriates in Austria